Lin Keng-chi (born 1 July 1966) is a Taiwanese professional golfer.

Career
Lin has won five tournaments on the Asian Tour and topped the Tour's money list in 1995. He has also played extensively on the Japan Golf Tour, where he had won three titles. In 2001 he reached the top 100 of the Official World Golf Rankings. He was a member of Asia's winning 2003 Dynasty Cup team.

Professional wins (9)

Japan Golf Tour wins (3)

Japan Golf Tour playoff record (1–0)

Asian Tour wins (5)

Other wins (1)
1998 Trans Strait Invitational

Team appearances
Amateur
Eisenhower Trophy (representing Taiwan): 1988

Professional
Dynasty Cup (representing Asia): 2013 (winners)

See also
List of golfers with most Asian Tour wins

References

External links

Taiwanese male golfers
Asian Tour golfers
Japan Golf Tour golfers
Sportspeople from Taipei
1966 births
Living people